Tess of the d'Urbervilles is a 1924 American silent drama film starring Blanche Sweet and Conrad Nagel. It was directed by Sweet's husband, Marshall Neilan. The film is the second motion picture adaptation of the 1891 novel by Thomas Hardy, which had been turned into a very successful 1897 play starring Mrs. Fiske. In 1913, Adolph Zukor enticed Mrs. Fiske  to reprise her role in a film version which is now considered lost. The 1924 version is also considered lost.

Plot
A young servant girl is seduced and raped by an older middle class man in Victorian England when employed in his household. After moving on with her path, she gets married. All is well until her husband discovers her past. This fact prompts her on a life of wandering, murder, and execution.

Cast

Production
After the film was completed, Louis B. Mayer changed the tragic ending to a happy one, much to the annoyance of Neilan and Hardy.

Preservation
With no prints of Tess of the d'Urbervilles located in any film archives, it is a lost film.

See also
Blanche Sweet filmography
Tess of the d'Urbervilles (1913)
Tess of the D'Urbervilles (2008)
List of lost films

References

External links

Period advertisement Tess of the d'Urbervilles
Pressbook promotional for the film

 

1924 films
1924 lost films
Lost drama films
American silent feature films
American black-and-white films
Films based on Tess of the d'Urbervilles
Films directed by Marshall Neilan
Films set in the 19th century
Films set in England
Lost American films
Metro-Goldwyn-Mayer films
1920s historical drama films
American historical drama films
1924 drama films
1920s American films
Silent American drama films